The 2009–10 Valparaiso Crusaders men's basketball team was an NCAA Division I college basketball team who competed in the Horizon League representing Valparaiso University. The Crusaders finished the season 15–17, 10–8 in Horizon League play and lost in the first round of the 2010 Horizon League men's basketball tournament to Detroit.

Coaching staff
 Homer Drew - Head coach
 Bryce Drew - Associate head coach
 Luke Gore - Assistant coach
 Chris Sparks - Assistant coach

Schedule

|-
!colspan=9 style=| Exhibition

|-
!colspan=9 style=| Regular season

|-
!colspan=9 style=| Horizon League tournament

References

Valparaiso Crusaders
Valparaiso Beacons men's basketball seasons
Valp
Valp